Bushmills (From Irish Muileann na Buaise) is a village on the north coast of County Antrim, Northern Ireland. Bushmills had a population of 1,295 in the 2011 Census. The village owes its name to the River Bush and to a large watermill that was built there in the early 17th century. It is home to the Old Bushmills Distillery, which produces Irish whiskey, and is near the Giant's Causeway.

Demography
Bushmills is classified as a village (population 1,000–2,499) by the Northern Ireland Statistics and Research Agency (NISRA). On Census day (27 March 2011) there were 1,295 people living in Bushmills. Of these:
 20.39% were under 16 years old and 21.47% were aged 65 and above;
 46.64% of the population were male and 53.36% were female; and
 3.47% were from a Catholic community background and 92.90% were from a 'Protestant and Other Christian (including Christian related)' community background.

Places of interest
The village is best known as the location of the Old Bushmills Distillery. The distillery's products include the Bushmills Original and Black Bush blends, as well as the 10-, 12-, 16-, and 21-year-old Bushmills Single Malts. To celebrate the 400th anniversary of distilling starting in the area the distillery released a unique whiskey called the "1608" which included crystal malt.  The distillery draws its water, not from the River Bush itself, but from a tributary known as Saint Columbs Rill.

Transport
Bushmills railway station opened on 28 January 1883, but finally closed on 1 October 1949. There is a narrow-gauge steam train running in the summer from Bushmills to the Giant's Causeway.

The Belfast-Derry railway line run by Northern Ireland Railways connects to Coleraine and along the branch line to Portrush. Local Ulsterbus provides connections to the railway stations. There is a scenic walk of 7 miles from Portrush alongside Dunluce Castle and the Giant's Causeway and Bushmills Railway.

Twin towns
Bushmills is twinned with Louisville, Kentucky, in the United States.

Education
Schools in the area include Dunluce School and Bushmills Primary School.

Churches
There are a few churches in the village:

Bushmills Presbyterian Church, Main Street, Magheraboy (1646)
Bushmills Gospel Hall, Priestland Road, Ballaghmore
Bushmills Free Presbyterian Church, Priestland Road, Walk Mill
St. John The Baptist Church of Ireland, Priestland Road, Glebe (1821)
St. Mary's Roman Catholic Church, Priestland Road, Ballaghmore

People
Norman Parke, a Mixed Martial Artist who fights in the UFC, was born and raised in Bushmills.
Caroline McElnay, Director of Public Health for the New Zealand Ministry of Health, was born and raised in Bushmills.

Navigation history
Bushmills was the location of one of the five Consol Navigation System transmitter stations in the years following the Second World War.

References

External links

Villages in County Antrim